Emanuel Trípodi (born January 8, 1981), is an Argentine football goalkeeper.

Club career
Trípodi made his professional debut for Unión, then he was transferred to CAI where he lived an unusual fact: he scored a goal. after this, in 2009 he joined Quilmes, he managed to get promoted two times with Quilmes. in 2013 he joined Boca Juniors.

References

External links
 
 

1981 births
Association football goalkeepers
Argentine footballers
Quilmes Atlético Club footballers
Boca Juniors footballers
Club Atlético Sarmiento footballers
Argentinos Juniors footballers
Chacarita Juniors footballers
Club Agropecuario Argentino players
Argentine Primera División players
Living people
People from Comodoro Rivadavia